The 2008 United States presidential election in Alaska took place on November 4, 2008, as part of the nationwide presidential election held throughout all 50 states and the District of Columbia. Voters chose 3 electors, or representatives to the Electoral College, who voted for president and vice president.

Alaska was won by Republican nominee John McCain with a 21.53% margin of victory. Prior to the election, all 17 news organizations considered this a state McCain would win, or otherwise considered as a safe red state. Democratic nominee Barack Obama did, however, perform better in 2008 than Democratic nominee John Kerry did in 2004. This is the first election in which it participated in which it failed to support the same candidate as Virginia and Indiana, and the only time in which it didn't do so for the latter.

The presence of popular Governor Sarah Palin on the ticket as the Republican Party's vice presidential nominee appeared to help. The McCain–Palin ticket received just a slightly smaller percentage of Alaskan votes than did Bush–Cheney in 2004 despite the nation's swinging Democratic by 4.66% (48.27% to 52.93%). Polls from April until August indeed showed John McCain with a slim lead, with one poll taken in early August even showing Obama five points ahead. However, from when Sarah Palin was announced as McCain's running mate on August 29, polls showed John McCain consistently ahead. RealClearPolitics gave the state an average of 55.8% for McCain, compared to 41.3% for Obama.

McCain's 193,841 votes is the most received by a presidential candidate in the state's history. This is also the most recent election in which Lake and Peninsula Borough, Northwest Arctic Borough, Aleutians West Census Area, Dillingham Census Area, and Yukon–Koyukuk Census Area voted for the Republican candidate.

Primaries 
2008 Alaska Democratic caucuses
2008 Alaska Republican caucuses

Campaign

Predictions 
There were 16 news organizations who made state-by-state predictions of the election. Here are their last predictions before election day:

Polling 

Opinion polls consistently showed John McCain to be leading Barack Obama. From April until August they showed John McCain with a slim lead, with one poll taken in early August showing Obama five points ahead. However, from when Sarah Palin was announced as McCain's running mate on August 29, polls showed John McCain consistently ahead. RealClearPolitics gave the state an average of 55.8% for McCain, compared to 41.3% for Obama.

Fundraising 
Barack Obama raised $977,438. John McCain raised $321,101.

Advertising and visits 
Obama spent $134,686. McCain and his interest groups spent just $1,836. The Democratic ticket didn't visit the state. Alaskan native Sarah Palin campaigned just once in the state during the fall election.

Analysis 
At the time of the election, Alaska had a Republican Governor and Lieutenant Governor (Sarah Palin and Sean Parnell, respectively) and was represented in both the U.S. Senate and the U.S. House of Representatives solely by Republicans (U.S. Senator Ted Stevens, who was defeated for reelection in 2008 by the former Democratic Mayor of Anchorage Mark Begich, and U.S. Senator Lisa Murkowski, and U.S. Representative Don Young). At the time of the election, Republicans held a majority in the Alaska House of Representatives whereas a coalition of Democrats and moderate Republicans controlled the Alaska Senate. Furthermore, since becoming a state in 1959, Alaska has voted for the Republican nominee in every presidential election with the exception of 1964 when the Last Frontier voted for president Lyndon B. Johnson in his 44-state landslide.

Early in the campaign, Obama actually bought some advertising in Alaska, apparently thinking that Libertarian Bob Barr could hold down McCain's numbers; Alaska has a history of supporting third-party candidates. Also, several polls in the early summer of 2008 showed the race within single digits (with one poll from Alaska pollster Hays Research showing Obama with a five-point lead).

While McCain would have been favored to win Alaska in any event, Palin's addition to the ticket ended any realistic chance of Obama carrying it. At the time, Palin was one of the most popular governors in the nation. At the same time, Representative Young was reelected to an 18th term by a narrow margin over Democrat Ethan Berkowitz in a highly contested U.S. House race—only the fifth time he had faced a close contest. Stevens, who was convicted earlier in the year on seven felony charges (though the conviction was subsequently vacated due to prosecutorial misconduct), was narrowly ousted by Begich. In the state legislature, Democrats picked up one seat in the State House and two members of the Coalition broke away and went back to their respective parties.

Results

Boroughs and Census Areas that flipped from Republican to Democratic 
 Bethel Census Area (largest city: Bethel)
 Kusilvak Census Area (largest city: Hooper Bay)
 Nome Census Area (largest city: Nome

Results by Congressional District
Alaska has an at-large congressional equivalent to the statewide results.

Electors 
Technically the voters of Alaska cast their ballots for electors—representatives to the Electoral College. Alaska is allocated 3 electors because it has 1 congressional districts and 2 senators. All candidates who appear on the ballot or qualify to receive write-in votes must submit a list of 3 electors, who pledge to vote for their candidate and his or her running mate. Whoever wins the majority of votes in the state is awarded all 3 electoral votes. Their chosen electors then vote for president and vice president. Although electors are pledged to their candidate and running mate, they are not obligated to vote for them. An elector who votes for someone other than his or her candidate is known as a faithless elector.

The electors of each state and the District of Columbia met on December 15, 2008, to cast their votes for president and vice president. The Electoral College itself never meets as one body. Instead the electors from each state and the District of Columbia met in their respective capitals.

The following were the members of the Electoral College from the state. All 3 were pledged to John McCain and Sarah Palin:
 Roy Burkhart
 Hope Nelson
 Robert Brodie

See also 
 United States presidential elections in Alaska

References 

Alaska
2008 Alaska elections
2008